Hungary competed at the 1996 Summer Olympics in Atlanta, United States. 212 competitors, 147 men and 65 women, took part in 145 events in 24 sports.

Medalists

Gold
 Balázs Kiss — Athletics, Men's Hammer Throw 
 István Kovács — Boxing, Men's Bantamweight 
 Csaba Horváth and György Kolonics — Canoeing, Men's C2 500 m Canadian Pairs 
 Rita Kőbán — Canoeing, Women's K1 500 m Kayak Singles
 Norbert Rózsa — Swimming, Men's 200 m Breaststroke 
 Attila Czene — Swimming, Men's 200 m Individual Medley 
 Krisztina Egerszegi — Swimming, Women's 200 m Backstroke

Silver
 Attila Adrovicz, Ferenc Csipes, Gábor Horváth and András Rajna — Canoeing, Men's K4 1000 m Kayak Fours 
 Csaba Köves, József Navarrete and Bence Szabó — Fencing, Men's Sabre Team 
 Szilveszter Csollány — Gymnastics, Men's Rings
 Károly Güttler — Swimming, Men's 200 m Breaststroke

Bronze
 Imre Pulai — Canoeing, Men's C1 500 m Canadian Singles 
 György Zala — Canoeing, Men's C1 1000 m Canadian Singles
 Csaba Horváth and György Kolonics — Canoeing, Men's C2 1000 m Canadian Singles
 Géza Imre — Fencing, Men's Épée Individual 
 Gyöngyi Szalay — Fencing, Women's Épée Individual 
 Éva Erdős, Andrea Farkas, Beáta Hoffmann, Anikó Kántor, Erzsébet Kocsis, Beatrix Kökény, Eszter Mátéfi, Auguszta Mátyás, Anikó Meksz, Anikó Nagy, Helga Németh, Ildikó Pádár, Beáta Siti, Anna Szántó, Katalin Szilágyi, and Beatrix Tóth — Handball, Women's Team Competition  
 János Martinek — Modern Pentathlon, Men's Individual Competition
 Ágnes Kovács — Swimming, Women's 200 m Breaststroke 
 Krisztina Egerszegi — Swimming, Women's 400 m Individual Medley 
 Attila Feri — Weightlifting, Men's Lightweight (70 kg)

Archery

Hungary's two veterans in Atlanta were both defeated in the first round.

Women's Individual Competition:
 Judit Kovács → Round of 64, 45th place (0–1)
 Timea Kiss → Round of 64, 51st place (0–1)

Athletics

Men's 400 m Hurdles
 Dusan Kovács 
 Heat — 49.23 s 
 Semi Final — 48.57 s (→ did not advance)

Men's Long Jump
 János Uzsoki
 Qualification — 7.82m (→ did not advance, 22nd place)

Men's Triple Jump
 Tibor Ordina
 Qualification — 16.04m (→ did not advance, 33rd place)

Men's Discus Throw 
 Attila Horváth
 Qualification — 62.90 m
 Final — 62.28 m (→ 10th place)

Men's Hammer Throw 
 Balázs Kiss
 Qualification — 78.34m
 Final — 81.24m (→  Gold Medal)

 Zsolt Németh
 Qualification — 73.68m (→ did not advance)

 Adrián Annus
 Qualification — 72.58m (→ did not advance)

Men's Decathlon 
 Zsolt Kürtösi
 Final Result — 7755 points (→ 27th place)

Women's Heptathlon 
 Rita Ináncsi
 Final Result — 6336 points (→ 6th place)

Women's Long Jump 
 Tünde Vaszi
 Qualification — 6.73m 
 Final — 6.60m (→ 9th place)

Rita Ináncsi
 Qualification — 6.02m (→ did not advance)

Women's Triple Jump
 Zita Balint
 Qualification — NM (→ no ranking)

Women's Marathon
 Judit Nagy — 2:38.43 (→ 36th place)

Women's 10 km Walk
 Mária Urbanik – 43:32 (→ 9th place)
 Anikó Szebenszky – 45:57 (→ 27th place)

Badminton

Boxing

Men's Bantamweight (– 54 kg)
István Kovács →  Gold Medal
 First Round — Defeated Soner Karaoz (Turkey), 15-3
 Second Round — Defeated Khurshed Khasanov (Tajikistan), 17-3
 Quarter Finals — Defeated George Olteanu (Romania), 24-2  
 Semi Finals — Defeated Vichairachanon Khadpo (Thailand), 12-7 
 Final — Defeated Arnaldo Mesa (Cuba), 14-7

Men's Featherweight (– 57 kg)
János Nagy
 First Round — Defeated John Kelman (Barbados), referee stopped contest in third round
 Second Round — Defeated Daniel Attah (Nigeria), 14-12 
 Quarter Finals — Lost to Pablo Chacón (Argentina), 7–18

Men's Welterweight (– 67 kg)
József Nagy
 First Round — Lost to Juan Hernández Sierra (Cuba), referee stopped contest in second round

Men's Light Middleweight (– 71 kg)
György Mizsei
 First Round — Defeated Richard Rowles (Australia), 10-2
 Second Round — Lost to Markus Beyer (Germany), 6–14

Men's Middleweight (– 75 kg)
Zsolt Erdei
 First Round — Defeated Juan Pablo López (Mexico), referee stopped contest in third round
 Second Round — Lost to Malik Beyleroğlu (Turkey), 8–9

Canoeing

Cycling

Diving

Men's 3m Springboard
Imre Lengyel
 Preliminary Heat — 346.74
 Semi Final — 204.51 (→ did not advance, 17th place)

Women's 3m Springboard
Orsolya Pintér
 Preliminary Heat — 206.52 (→ did not advance, 25th place)

Equestrianism

Fencing

Fifteen fencers, nine men and six women, represented Hungary in 1996.

Men's foil
 Zsolt Érsek
 Márk Marsi
 Róbert Kiss

Men's team foil
 Márk Marsi, Róbert Kiss, Zsolt Érsek

Men's épée
 Géza Imre
 Iván Kovács
 Krisztián Kulcsár

Men's team épée
 Géza Imre, Iván Kovács, Krisztián Kulcsár

Men's sabre
 József Navarrete
 Bence Szabó
 Csaba Köves

Men's team sabre
 Bence Szabó, Csaba Köves, József Navarrete

Women's foil
 Aida Mohamed
 Zsuzsa Némethné Jánosi
 Gabriella Lantos

Women's team foil
 Aida Mohamed, Gabriella Lantos, Zsuzsa Némethné Jánosi

Women's épée
 Gyöngyi Szalay-Horváth
 Tímea Nagy
 Adrienn Hormay

Women's team épée
 Adrienn Hormay, Gyöngyi Szalay-Horváth, Tímea Nagy

Football

Gymnastics

Handball

Judo

Modern pentathlon

Men's Individual Competition:
 János Martinek — 5501 pts (→  Bronze Medal)
 Ákos Hanzély — 5435 pts (→ 6th place)
 Péter Sárfalvi — 5196 pts (→ 21st place)

Rhythmic gymnastics

Rowing

Sailing

Men's Laser sailing
 Tamás Eszes

Shooting

Swimming

Men's 100 m Freestyle
 Attila Zubor
 Heat — 50.43 (→ did not advance, 20th place)

 Béla Szabados
 Heat — 51.26 (→ did not advance, 35th place)

Men's 200 m Freestyle
 Attila Czene
 Heat — 1:51.59 (→ did not advance, 20th place)

 Miklós Kollár
 Heat — 1:52.19 (→ did not advance, 25th place)

Men's 400 m Freestyle
 Béla Szabados
 Heat — 3:59.36 (→ did not advance, 23rd place)

Men's 100 m Backstroke
 Tamás Deutsch
 Heat — 56.96 (→ did not advance, 25th place)

Men's 200 m Backstroke
 Olivér Ágh
 Heat — 2:01.84 
 B-Final — 2:02.17 (→ 12th place)

Men's 100 m Breaststroke
 Károly Güttler
 Heat — 1:01.80 
 Final — 1:01.49 (→ 4th place)

 Norbert Rózsa
 Heat — 1:02.72 
 B-Final — scratched

Men's 200 m Breaststroke
 Norbert Rózsa
 Heat — 2:14.66
 Final — 2:12.57 (→  Gold Medal)

 Károly Güttler
 Heat — 2:13.89
 Final — 2:13.03 (→  Silver Medal)

Men's 100 m Butterfly
 Péter Horváth
 Heat — 53.69
 B-Final — 53.48 (→ 11th place)
 
Men's 200 m Butterfly
 Péter Horváth
 Heat — 1:58.76
 Final — 1:59.12 (→ 8th place)

 Attila Czene
 Heat — 2:00.50
 B-Final — 1:58.99 (→ 9th place)
   
Men's 200 m Individual Medley
 Attila Czene
 Heat — 2:02.10
 Final — 1:59.91 (→  Gold Medal)

 Attila Zubor
 Heat — 2:06.24 (→ did not advance, 22nd place)

Men's 400 m Individual Medley
 István Batházi
 Heat — 4:27.37
 B-Final — DSQ

 Gergő Kis
 Heat — 4:28.05 (→ did not advance, 19th place)

Men's 4 × 100 m Medley Relay
 Tamás Deutsch, Károly Güttler, Péter Horváth, and Attila Zubor
 Heat — 3:41.05
 Tamás Deutsch, Károly Güttler, Péter Horváth, and Attila Czene
 Final — 3:40.84 (→ 6th place)

Women's 100 m Freestyle
 Anna Nyíry
 Heat — 57.82 (→ did not advance, 30th place)

Women's 800 m Freestyle
 Rita Kovács
 Heat — 9:06.97 (→ did not advance, 25th place)

Women's 200 m Backstroke
 Krisztina Egerszegi
 Heat — 2:09.18 
 Final — 2:07.83 (→  Gold Medal)

Women's 100 m Breaststroke
 Ágnes Kovács
 Heat — 1:09.05
 Final — 1:09.55 (→ 7th place)

Women's 200 m Breaststroke
 Ágnes Kovács
 Heat — 2:29.58
 Final — 2:26.57 (→  Bronze Medal)

Women's 100 m Butterfly
 Edit Klocker
 Heat — 1:03.61 (→ did not advance, 30th place)

Women's 200 m Butterfly
 Edit Klocker
 Heat — 2:17.90 (→ did not advance, 24th place)

Women's 400 m Individual Medley
 Krisztina Egerszegi
 Heat — 4:43.09 
 Final — 4:42.53 (→  Bronze Medal)

Women's 4 × 100 m Medley Relay
 Krisztina Egerszegi, Ágnes Kovács, Edit Klocker, and Anna Nyíry
 Heat — 4:10.92 (→ did not advance, 11th place)

Table tennis

Tennis

Men's Singles Competition
 Sándor Noszály
 First round — Lost to Oleg Ogorodov (Uzbekistan) 5–7, 6–7
Alternates
Gergely Kisgyorgy
Daniel Somogyi

Women's Singles Competition
 Virág Csurgó
 First round — Defeated Aleksandra Olsza (Poland) 6-2 7-5
 Second round — Lost to Kimiko Date (Japan) 2–6 3–6

 Andrea Temesvári
 First round — Lost to Judith Wiesner (Austria) 6–7 4–6

Water polo

Men's team competition
Preliminary round (group A)
Defeated Russia (8–7)
Defeated Germany (9–8)
Defeated Netherlands (10–8)
Defeated Spain (8–7)
Defeated Yugoslavia (12–8)
Quarterfinals
Defeated Greece (12–8)
Semifinals
Lost to Spain (6–7)
Bronze Medal Match
Lost to Italy (18–20) → Fourth place

Team roster
Tibor Benedek
Rajmund Fodor
Tamás Kásás
Zoltan Kosz
András Gyöngyösi
Péter Kuna
László Tóth
Balázs Vincze
Frank Tóth
Zsolt Varga
Tamás Dala
Attila Monostori
Zsolt Németh 
Head coach: György Horkai

Weightlifting

Men

Wrestling

References

Nations at the 1996 Summer Olympics
Olympics
1996 Summer Olympics